Stackhousia is a genus of annual and perennial plants in the family Celastraceae that are native to Australia, New Zealand, Malesia and Micronesia. The genus was first described by James Edward Smith in  Transactions of the Linnean Society of London in 1798.

It was formerly placed in Stackhousiaceae, but under the APG II system this family has been folded into Celastraceae.

Species include:
Stackhousia annua W.R.Barker 
Stackhousia aspericocca Schuch. 
Stackhousia clementii Domin  
Stackhousia dielsii Pamp.  - Yellow stackhousia
Stackhousia gunnii Hook.f. now Stackhousia subterranea 
Stackhousia huegelii Endl. 
Stackhousia intermedia F.M.Bailey 
Stackhousia megaloptera F.Muell. 
Stackhousia minima Hook.f. 
Stackhousia monogyna Labill.   - Creamy candles, creamy stackhousia       
Stackhousia muricata Lindl.  
Stackhousia pubescens A.Rich.  - Downy stackhousia
Stackhousia pulvinaris F.Muell. - Alpine stackhousia
Stackhousia scoparia Benth.  
Stackhousia spathulata Sieber ex Spreng.
Stackhousia stratfordiae  W.R.Barker & Cockerton	
Stackhousia subterranea W.R.Barker - Gunn's mignonette, grasslands candles     
Stackhousia tryonii F.M.Bailey 
Stackhousia umbellata C.A.Gardner & A.S.George  
Stackhousia viminea Sm. - Slender stackhousia

References

 

 
Celastrales genera